Matthewstown Passage Tomb is a passage tomb situated in County Waterford, Ireland.

Location
The tomb is located 1.6 km (1 mile) north of Fenor. Most of the surrounding countryside is visible, to the Comeragh Mountains.

History
Matthewstown Passage Tomb dates to 2500–2000 BC. It is locally known as Thomas McCabe's Bed; this may have been the name of a local outlaw who supposedly spent a night here: cf. the many "Diarmuid and Gráinne's Beds"

This is one of a group of small passage tombs in Co. Waterford with affinities to the tombs in Cornwall and the Scilly Isles, hence the name "Scilly-Tramore group," suggesting that the builders were seafarers from Cornwall.

Description

Matthewstown Passage Tomb is 4.5 m (fifteen feet) long and about 1.8 m (six feet) wide. There are two rows of five orthostats protruding above the ground to about 1 metre (three-and-a-half feet). This grave was covered by four large stone slabs.

References

Archaeological sites in County Waterford
Buildings and structures in County Waterford
National Monuments in County Waterford